The XXIV 2020 Pan Am Badminton Championships is a continental championships tournament of badminton in Pan America. This tournament were held as two events in different countries. From 13 to 16 February, the team event was held in Salvador, Bahia, Brazil. From 23 to 26 April, the individual event was planned to be held in Guatemala City, Guatemala.

Tournament 
The team event of 2020 Pan Am Badminton Championships officially Pan Am Male & Female Cup 2020, is a continental stage tournament of 2020 Thomas & Uber Cup, and also to crown the best men's and women's badminton team in Pan America. This event organized by the Badminton Pan Am and Confederação Brasileira de Badminton. 13 teams, consisting of 6 men's teams and 7 women's teams entered the tournament.

The individual event of 2020 Pan Am Badminton Championships was planned to be held from 23 to 26 April in Guatemala City, Guatemala, but later the tournament was moved to Lima, Peru. The Championships then were suspended in 2020 due to the COVID-19 pandemic, with competition in Lima eventually being cancelled.

Venue 
The team event is being held at Centro Pan-Americano de Judô in the city of Salvador, Bahia, Brazil.

Medalists

Medal table

Team events

Men's team

Group A 

Canada vs. Brazil

Mexico vs. Brazil

Canada vs. Mexico

Group B 

United States vs. Peru

Guatemala vs. Peru

United States vs. Guatemala

Fifth place match 
Brazil vs. Peru

First to fourth place

Semifinals 
Canada vs. Guatemala

Mexico vs. United States

Third place match 
Guatemala vs. United States

Final 
Canada vs. Mexico

Women's team

Group A 

Canada vs. Guatemala

Mexico vs. Guatemala

Canada vs. Mexico

Group B 

United States vs. Falkland Islands

Peru vs. Brazil

United States vs. Brazil

Peru vs. Falkland Islands

United States vs. Peru

Brazil vs. Falkland Islands

Fifth to seventh place

5th-7th place playoff 
Falkland Islands vs. Guatemala

Fifth place match 
Peru vs. Guatemala

First to fourth place

Semifinals 
Canada vs. Brazil

Mexico vs. United States

Third place match 
Brazil vs. Mexico

Final 
Canada vs. United States

References

External links
Tournament Link: Individual Results
Tournament Link: Team Results

Pan Am Badminton Championships
Pan Am Badminton Championships
Badminton tournaments in Brazil
International sports competitions hosted by Brazil
Pan Am Badminton Championships
Pan Am Badminton Championships
Pan Am Badminton